Budiawan (born September 9, 1990) is an Indonesian footballer who plays as a midfielder.

Career
His first goal for Persib Bandung is against Deltras.

Honours

Club
Persib Bandung U-21
 Indonesia Super League U-21: 2009-10

References

External links

1990 births
Association football midfielders
Living people
Indonesian footballers
Liga 1 (Indonesia) players
Persib Bandung players
Sportspeople from Bandung